Guhle is a surname. Notable people with the surname include:
 Brendan Guhle (born 1997), Canadian former professional ice hockey defenceman
 Kaiden Guhle (born 2002), Canadian ice hockey defenceman